The Finland men's national ball hockey team is the men's national ball hockey team of Finland, and a member of the International Street and Ball Hockey Federation (ISBHF).

World Championships

External links 
http://www.ballhockey.fi
 ISBHF Official Site 

Ball hockey
Men's sport in Finland
National sports teams of Finland